is a district located in Okayama Prefecture, Japan.

As of 2003, the district has an estimated population of 21,601 and a population density of 789.80 persons per km2. The total area is 27.35 km2.

Towns and villages
Hayashima

Merger
On March 22, 2005, the villages of Yamate and Kiyone merged into the city of Sōja.

Districts in Okayama Prefecture